Newcastle International Sports Centre, known as McDonald Jones Stadium for sponsorship reasons, is a multi-purpose sports stadium located in Newcastle, Australia. The ground is home to the Newcastle Knights (National Rugby League) and Newcastle Jets FC (A-League). It is owned by the New South Wales Government and is administered by Venues NSW (which consolidates the operations and responsibilities of the former Hunter Region Sporting Venues Authority and other regional sporting venues authorities into one authority managed by one governing board). Due to past sponsorship deals, the ground has been previously known as Marathon Stadium, EnergyAustralia Stadium, Ausgrid Stadium and Hunter Stadium. Newcastle International Sports Centre is also known as Newcastle Stadium when in use during AFC competitions due to conflicting sponsorship reasons.

History 
Work began on the stadium on 1 December 1967, and was officially opened by Queen Elizabeth II on 10 April 1970. It was originally known as the International Sports Centre, and is still part of the ISC complex to this day. The playing surface back then was originally oval shaped to allow both codes of rugby, soccer and cricket to be able to make use of it.

The Knights secured a lease on the stadium in 1986, and converted it from an oval to a rectangle layout. During the 1988 Great Britain Lions tour, the Newcastle Knights, in their first season, hosted a match at the ground. On that occasion the Lions, captained by Ellery Hanley, defeated the Knights 28–12.

In  1992, local tyre outlet Marathon Tyres became the naming rights sponsor for the stadium, and it was renamed Marathon Stadium. That year the Knights played Great Britain for a second time as part of the Lions Tour of Australasia. The Ellery Hanley captained Lions took the Knights apart winning 22–0. Later in the 1992 NSWRL season, the Knights qualified for their first ever Finals series.

Towards the end of 2001, energy supplier EnergyAustralia took over naming rights, and thus the stadium became EnergyAustralia Stadium. In February 2011 it was announced that the stadium would be renamed to "Ausgrid Stadium" after EnergyAustralia was renamed "Ausgrid".

Before redevelopment, the stadium had a capacity of 28,000, including 5,000 in the main grandstand. The ground attendance record for a sporting event at the venue prior to the redevelopments is 32,642, which was set when the Knights took on the Manly-Warringah Sea Eagles in July 1995.

Following the retirement of former Knights captain Andrew Johns, the new eastern grandstand was renamed The Andrew Johns Stand in honour of Johns in front of a packed crowd before the Knights vs Brisbane Broncos NRL match on Sunday 22 April 2007.

The name (Newcastle International Sports Centre) is used primarily by those who wish to mention stadiums by original names, such as non-commercial organisations like the Australian Broadcasting Corporation, and those with other corporate interests such as FIFA or the Asian Football Confederation.

On 16 October 2011, the venue's all-time record sporting attendance was set with 32,890 attending the Australia vs New Zealand Rugby League test match.

In October 2016, McDonald Jones Homes, a local Newcastle company, was named as the new naming rights sponsor of the stadium. This new deal left behind a 5-year gap between naming rights sponsors at the ground.

Redevelopments

2003–05 
The stadium underwent redevelopment during the years 2003–05, funded mostly by local and state government grants.

Factors that brought on the redevelopment included:
 non-compliance of National Rugby League (NRL) stadium criteria, especially the dressing rooms;
 failure to attract major sporting events to the area, specifically the 2003 Rugby World Cup;
 inadequate and ageing spectator and corporate facilities;
 covered seating capacity well below best practice and NRL standards;
 minimal areas within the grandstand to increase members' patronage both during a sporting event and on non-match-days;
 poor facilities for media officials;
 unsatisfactory temporary spectator facilities to the north and south of the western stand;
 the perceived need for the incumbent State Labor government to contribute to the public infrastructure in a region of safe seats.

The first stage of the redevelopment was completed in early 2004. This consisted of;
 The construction of the lower level of the Eastern Stand (brought into operation for the 2004 NRL season and Anzac Test between Australia and New Zealand). This level holds 7,700 people.
 The relocation of corporate boxes and seating to the North and South stands.

The second stage of construction began in 2004 and was completed in 2005. This consisted of:
 The construction of the Eastern Stand's second level of seating and corporate boxes;
 a new video screen; and
 remedial work for the Western Grandstand, including updating the media facilities.

2008–11 
During the 2007 NSW Election campaign, the Premier Morris Iemma promised $30 million towards an upgrade of the stadium, conditional on the Federal Government matching the funds.

On 1 April 2008 the federal government confirmed $10m towards the development of the Western Grandstand. This was in addition to the $30m commitment from the state government. This was a critical step for the stadium's development for the upgrade to be in by 2011.  The A$40 million contributed to an expansion of the stadium's capacity to eventually hold over 40,000 as well as general improvements in the stadiums facilities.

From 2008 to 2010 the stadium was upgraded again to around 33 000 seats, with a hope for the stadium to be involved in the 2015 Asian Cup and 2018 World Cup were Australia be the host of those tournaments (Australia did host the Asian Cup, but not the World Cup). As part of the announcement, Morris Iemma stated that the capacity of 33,000 could be increased to the 40,000 necessary for World Cup Hosting, through temporary seating. The total cost of the upgrade was estimated as $60 million, with $50 million from the state government and $10 million from the Federal Government.
Although construction was slated to take place during both the Newcastle Knights and Newcastle Jets seasons, developers stated that there would be minimal effect on attendances due to the staged approach.

The stadium development was planned to be carried out over four stages.

Stage 1 (now completed) included dressing, warm up and medical rooms, with showers, toilets, ice baths and 855-seats of the spectator concourse in the stadium's south-west.
Stage 2 (now completed) replicates Stage 1 on the northern side of the Western Grandstand and also included the main western stand's lower concourse.
Stage 3 (now completed) demolished the old western Grandstand and is replacing it with one similar to the eastern stand.
Stage 4 (undertaking preparation) will involve building the northern and southern ends of the ground, replacing the grass hills with seated areas.

Newcastle Knights Centre of Excellence 
In June 2018, plans were announced for a Centre of Excellence for the Newcastle Knights located at the southern end of the ground at a cost of $20 million with $10 million provided by the NSW government with the other $10 million funded by the Knights' owners The Wests Group.

Uses

Rugby league 
The Newcastle Knights of the National Rugby League team have been tenants of the ground since their formation in 1988.

In October 2011 the ground hosted a rugby league one-off test match between Australia and New Zealand. This event set a new ground attendance record for a sporting event of 32,890.

Soccer 

During the National Soccer League competition, three clubs have played their home ground games at this stadium. They are Newcastle KB United (1978–84); Newcastle Rosebud United (1984–86) and Newcastle United (2000–04). The NSL competition folded in 2004.

In 2005, the newly formed national competition (A-League) began to operate. Newcastle United Jets was part of the newly formed competition, and have played at this ground ever since.

The stadium also hosted two 2015 AFC Asian Cup group stage matches, and also a semi final between Australia and the United Arab Emirates and a third place playoff between United Arab Emirates and Iraq.

In February 2017 it was announced that the National Premier Leagues Northern NSW Grand Final would be taking place at the ground in September that year. In the Grand Final between the Edgeworth Eagles and Lambton Jaffas a crowd of 4174 was on hand to see the Jaffas clinch the title beating the Eagles 2–0 deep into Extra Time.

The 2018 A-League Grand Final was held at the venue, contested by the Newcastle Jets and Melbourne Victory, on 5 May 2018.

Baseball 
The Hunter Eagles were formed for the 1994–95 Australian Baseball League season after purchasing the Sydney Wave's licence. The Eagles played in the Australian Baseball League until the end of the 1997–98 season.

Rugby union 
In 2012, it was used for the first match of the 2012 Scotland rugby union tour of Oceania. Scotland won the match, beating Australia 9–6.

The New South Wales Waratahs have announced they will play a home fixture of their Super Rugby season from 2019 in Newcastle whilst the Sydney Football Stadium (2022) is under construction.

Notable games

Rugby league test matches
The venue has hosted three Australia internationals and one Rugby League World Cup game. The results were as follows; Hunter Stadium was also chosen as the host venue for the 2016 Anzac Test between Australia and New Zealand on 6 May.

Rugby League World Cup

Rugby league tour matches
The Newcastle Knights twice hosted the Great Britain Lions at the stadium.

2015 AFC Asian Cup matches

References

External links 
Official site

EnergyAustralia Stadium page at newcastleknights.com.au

Sports venues in New South Wales
A-League Men stadiums
A-League Women stadiums
Rugby league stadiums in Australia
Rugby League World Cup stadiums
Newcastle Knights
Newcastle Jets FC
Soccer venues in New South Wales
1970 establishments in Australia
Sports venues completed in 1970